Zehava Gal-On (born 4 January 1956) is an Israeli politician, serving as a member of the Knesset from 1999 to 2017. She was the chairwoman of the Meretz political party from 2012 to 2018 and again since 2022.

Biography
Zlata Shnipitskaya (later Zehava Gal-On) was born in 1956 in Vilnius in the Soviet Union (now in Lithuania). She immigrated at age four to Israel in 1960 with her parents: father Aryeh (born 30 December 1925), a plumber for a subsidiary of Solel Boneh (a construction company), and mother, Yaffa (19 February 1923 – 10 March 2012), a teacher. They lived in a ma'abara transit camp and eventually moved to a housing project in Petah Tikva. During her service in the Israel Defense Forces, Schnipitzky served as a clerk in the Paratroopers Brigade. She earned a bachelor's degree in Special Education and Linguistics from Beit Berl College, and an M.A. in the Philosophy of Education from the Hebrew University of Jerusalem.

Family
Gal-On is married to Pesach (born 5 December 1953). They have two sons, Yiftah (born 4 March 1980) and Nadav (born 28 January 1982), and still lives in Petah Tikva.

Political career
Gal-On served as general secretary of the paper Politika, of the Human Rights organization B'Tselem, and of the Ratz party. She is a member of the general directorate of Meretz. Among her main activities: the struggle for human and civil rights, women's rights, and the fight for social justice.

In regards to IDF refuseniks, she has said that "Meretz should not go with the wind of refusal, but should not try to oppose it. We are a party that believes in ideological pluralism and should not bury our heads in the sand. Meretz must show empathy towards the refuseniks and must bring the matter up for public discussion and reveal the reasons why the officers are refusing to serve."

She was elected to the Knesset in 1999, and served as chairwoman of the Knesset committee for the struggle against trafficking in women. She was a member of the Knesset law and constitution committee and the Knesset committee. That same year, she also called for a repeal of the Law of Return, stating that "The Law of Return is discriminatory, it discriminates between Jews and non-Jews. I can accept that after the Holocaust, it was kind of a necessity. But maybe after 51 years, we are not in the same situation, and we don't need to run our country based on such undemocratic laws."

In 2007, Gal-On launched an unsuccessful bid to become the leader of Meretz in the 2008 Meretz leadership election. She expressed her belief that the party needed to reinvent itself and promote a civilian agenda, which encompasses human rights and civil liberties, in order to remain politically viable. Gal-On said that Meretz could not afford to watch while other parties adopted some of its long-time positions, and it must work to cement the principles of democracy and equality in Israeli society. She lost to Haim Oron, as the polls predicted.

Gal-On volunteered her third spot on the Meretz list for the 2009 elections as a gesture of respect for Nitzan Horowitz, but lost her seat when the party was reduced to three seats. She attributed the party's failure to its uncertain response to Israel's Operation Cast Lead, and said: "My opinion was different than that of most party members. Because Meretz is an ideological party, it must have a clear statement even in such a situation". In March 2011 she returned to the Knesset after Haim Oron retired.

On 7 February 2012, Gal-On was elected Meretz party chair, with more than 60% of the vote in the party's primary. In the 2013 legislative elections Meretz doubled its number of seats from three to six.

Prior to the 2015 legislative election, Gal-On said during the campaign that she would resign if the party won only four seats. When preliminary results of the 2015 election indicated that the party would be reduced in representation, Gal-On announced she would resign as chairperson of Meretz as soon as a successor is chosen, and from the Knesset in order to open a place for Tamar Zandberg, the party's fifth-place candidate, who appeared to have lost her seat. Zandberg, Ilan Gilon and others urged Gal-On to reconsider her decision. Once absentee and soldier ballots were counted, Meretz gained a fifth seat.

With this success, Gal-On announced that she continue as party leader. She said: "Meretz received a fifth seat from young supporters, from Israeli soldiers, who raised the party's rate of support. That allowed Meretz to maintain its strength in terms of the number of voters – some 170,000 – compared with the last election. Under the circumstances and against all odds, that is a success."

In October 2017 Gal-On resigned from the Knesset, but said she would remain leader of Meretz. Her seat was taken by Mossi Raz.

In 2019, Gal-on established the NGO Zulat for Equality and Human Rights, and she serves as the organization president.

Gal-On initially announced her candidacy for the 2018 Meretz leadership race, but eventually dropped out. Tamar Zandberg was elected party chair.

Following her retirement from political life, Gal-On became a regular columnist for the liberal Haaretz daily newspaper.

Coming out of political retirement, Gal-On announced on 19 July 2022 that she would run in the Meretz leadership election that was scheduled to take place on 23 August. Gal-On was elected, defeating Yair Golan. Gal-on led Meretz into a legislative election in November, in which the party failed to cross the electoral threshold, winning no seats as a result. On 17 November 2022, Gal-On announced her intention to resign as party leader.

References

External links
 

1956 births
Living people
Hebrew University of Jerusalem alumni
Israeli feminists
Israeli people of Lithuanian-Jewish descent
Women members of the Knesset
Israeli women's rights activists
Jewish feminists
Jewish Israeli politicians
Israeli LGBT rights activists
Members of the 15th Knesset (1999–2003)
Members of the 16th Knesset (2003–2006)
Members of the 17th Knesset (2006–2009)
Members of the 18th Knesset (2009–2013)
Members of the 19th Knesset (2013–2015)
Members of the 20th Knesset (2015–2019)
Meretz leaders
People from Petah Tikva
Ratz (political party) politicians
Soviet emigrants to Israel
Soviet Jews
21st-century Israeli women politicians
20th-century Israeli women politicians
Jewish women writers
Israeli columnists
Israeli women columnists